Tom Crawford (born 30 May 1999) is an English professional footballer who plays as a central midfielder for  club Hartlepool United.

Early and personal life
Crawford is from Blacon.

Club career
Crawford began his career with Stoke City, before being released at the age of 15. He then joined the Academy of Chester. He made his senior debut for Chester in the 2017–18 season. During the 2017–18 season he also spent loan spells at Runcorn Town and Leek Town.

After rejecting a new contract with Chester, he signed for Notts County in May 2018. He made his professional debut on 14 August 2018 in the EFL Cup against Middlesbrough, in which he scored his first goal for the club. He joined AFC Fylde on loan on 24 January 2019 until the end of the 2018–19 season. On 12 August 2019 the club announced that Crawford could go out on loan. He was released by the club at the end of the 2019–20 season.

On 24 August 2020, Crawford signed for National League side Hartlepool United, rejoining old AFC Fylde boss Dave Challinor. Early in Crawford's Hartlepool career he struggled with injury but he became a regular starter for the side during the 2021–22 season. Crawford scored his first Hartlepool goal in a 1–1 draw at home to Sutton United. In April 2022, he signed a new two-year contract with Hartlepool. In November 2022, due to an ongoing ankle injury, Crawford underwent surgery which ruled him out until late in the 2022–23 campaign.

International career
He made his debut for England C as a substitute in May 2018 against Republic of Ireland amateurs.

Career statistics

Honours
AFC Fylde
FA Trophy: 2018–19

Hartlepool United
National League play-offs: 2021

References

1999 births
Living people
English footballers
Association football midfielders
Stoke City F.C. players
Chester F.C. players
Runcorn Town F.C. players
Leek Town F.C. players
Notts County F.C. players
AFC Fylde players
Hartlepool United F.C. players
English Football League players
National League (English football) players